Wiedermann is a surname. Notable people with the surname include:

Bedřich Antonín Wiedermann (1883–1951), Czech organist, composer, and teacher
Herbert Wiedermann (born 1927), Austrian sprint canoer
Helga Hellebrand-Wiedermann (1930–2013), Austrian sprint canoer

See also
Wiedemann

German-language surnames